The 1989 Kansas City Royals season  was a season in American baseball. It involved the Royals finishing second in the American League West with a record of 92 wins and 70 losses.  The Royals' record was tied for the third best in baseball, but in the pre-wild card era, the team did not qualify for the post-season.

Offseason
 November 30, 1988: Bob Boone was signed as a free agent by the Royals.
 December 6, 1988: Bill Buckner was signed as a free agent by the Royals.
 December 6, 1988: Mauro Gozzo was drafted by the Toronto Blue Jays from the Kansas City Royals in the 1988 minor league draft.
 March 22, 1989: Daryl Smith was signed as a free agent by the Royals.

Regular season
 May 15, 1989: Royals pitcher Floyd Bannister threw exactly three pitches and recorded three outs. This was accomplished in the second inning.
 June 5, 1989: Kansas City outfielder Bo Jackson made a spectacular defensive play in a game against the Seattle Mariners at the Kingdome. With the game tied at 3-3 in the bottom of the 10th inning and Harold Reynolds on first, Scott Bradley lashed a double to deep left field. Reynolds, running with the pitch, thought he would easily score the winning run on the play, and was shocked when teammate Darnell Coles instructed him to slide. Jackson fielded Bradley's double and launched a flat-footed, 300-foot throw on the fly to Royals catcher Bob Boone, who tagged Reynolds out at the plate.
During the season, Bret Saberhagen would be the last pitcher to win at least 20 games in one season for the Royals in the 20th century.
The last time the Royals will win at least 90 games until the 2015 season.

Season standings

Record vs. opponents

Transactions
June 5, 1989: Brent Mayne was drafted by the Kansas City Royals in the 1st round (13th pick) of the 1989 amateur draft. Player signed June 16, 1989.

Roster

Player stats

Batting

Starters by position
Note: Pos = Position; G = Games played; AB = At bats; H = Hits; Avg. = Batting average; HR = Home runs; RBI = Runs batted in

Other batters
Note: G = Games played; AB = At bats; H = Hits; Avg. = Batting average; HR = Home runs; RBI = Runs batted in

Pitching

Starting pitchers 
Note: G = Games; IP = Innings pitched; W = Wins; L = Losses; ERA = Earned run average; SO = Strikeouts

Other pitchers 
Note: G = Games pitched; IP = Innings pitched; W = Wins; L = Losses; ERA = Earned run average; SO = Strikeouts

Relief pitchers 
Note: G = Games; W = Wins; L = Losses; SV = Saves; ERA = Earned run average; SO = Strikeouts

Awards and honors
 Bo Jackson, All-Star Game, American League, Starting Lineup
 Bo Jackson, MLB All-Star Game MVP
 Bret Saberhagen, Cy Young Award

Farm system

References

External links
1989 Kansas City Royals at Baseball Reference
1989 Kansas City Royals at Baseball Almanac

Kansas City Royals seasons
Kansas City Royals
1989 in sports in Missouri